Gardenia vulcanica is a species of plant in the family Rubiaceae native to Luzon province in the Philippines.

References

vulcanica